†Cyclosurus mariei was a species of small, air-breathing, land snails with an operculum, terrestrial pulmonate gastropod molluscs in the family Cyclophoridae.

This species was endemic to Mayotte. It is now extinct.

References

Cyclophoridae
Extinct gastropods
Gastropods described in 1881
Taxonomy articles created by Polbot
Endemic fauna of Mayotte